"Know Your Worth" is a song by American singer Khalid and English duo Disclosure. It was released as a single through RCA Records on February 4, 2020. It appears on the deluxe version of Disclosure's third studio album, Energy (2020). Following the 2019 song "Talk", the song marks the second collaboration between the singer and the duo.

Background and promotion
About the song, Khalid revealed that he feels like "the message in this song is something that I needed to hear at the time I was writing it and I hope that it resonates with a lot of people who need to hear that kind of message". Khalid announced the song through social media on January 24, 2020. The announcement was accompanied by the cover art which depicts the upper half of his face in a turquoise blue light and a clip of the chorus of the song. The song was used by Levi's for a campaign video of XX Chino.

Critical reception
Alex Nino Gheciu of Complex described the song as "a self-empowerment jam" which "is a decidedly more upbeat, dancefloor-ready affair" compared to his previous single "Eleven". Stereogum'''s Chris DeVille thought that the track is by no means a ""Talk" redux" but "a subtly propulsive, bass-heavy dance track" which "is far closer to the top of his discography than the bottom". Michael Saponara at Billboard'' noted that the singer "floats over the soft electronic production with a message for a certain lover".

Charts

Weekly charts

Year-end charts

Certifications

Release history

References

2020 singles
2020 songs
Khalid (singer) songs
Disclosure (band) songs
Songs written by Jimmy Napes
Songs written by Guy Lawrence
Songs written by Khalid (singer)
Songs written by Tems (singer)